Prognichthys is a genus of flying fishes.

Species
Six recognized species are in this genus:
 Prognichthys brevipinnis (Valenciennes, 1847) (shortfin flyingfish)
 Prognichthys gibbifrons (Valenciennes, 1847) (bluntnose flyingfish)
 Prognichthys glaphyrae Parin, 1999 (Gyre flyingfish)
 Prognichthys occidentalis Parin, 1999
 Prognichthys sealei T. Abe, 1955 (sailor flyingfish)
 Prognichthys tringa Breder, 1928 (Tringa flyingfish)

References

Cypsellurinae